Eastland Mall was an enclosed shopping mall in Columbus, Ohio. The mall opened February 14, 1968 and closed on December 27, 2022. There are 4 vacant anchor stores that were once Lazarus, JCPenney, Sears, and Macy's. The mall is owned and managed by Eastland Mall Holdings, LLC. Despite having no anchor stores, the mall's interior was until recently thriving with many smaller businesses and its food court, unusual for a mall lacking anchors and thus having enough tenants to keep it from being a dead mall. It would, however, later succumb to that fate.

History
The mall was built in 1968 by Richard E. Jacobs group, who also developed Columbus's Northland and Westland Malls. It was the first enclosed shopping mall in Columbus. As with the other two "directional" Jacobs malls in Columbus, Eastland's original anchors included J. C. Penney, Sears, and Lazarus.

Although Eastland itself is a single-story mall, all three of its original anchor stores were constructed with two stories of retail space.  The Sears store closed off its upper level at some point during the 1980s.

With the closure and subsequent demolition of Northland in 2002, Eastland became the oldest shopping mall in the Columbus metro area.

The mall remained under Jacobs' ownership until Glimcher Realty Trust bought it in December 2003. The property became Glimcher's second mall in Columbus, following Polaris Fashion Place. Among Glimcher's first moves with the property was to add a fourth anchor, Kaufmann's. This Kaufmann's was the first in a "lifestyle" prototype featuring a smaller floor plan with wider aisles. The same year, the Lazarus store became Lazarus-Macy's. Macy's moved from the former Lazarus to the former Kaufmann's in 2006 when the Macy's chain purchased Kaufmann's then-parent company. Three years later, Glimcher proposed to demolish the former Lazarus-Macy's building for a new J. C. Penney, while dividing Penney's existing store among new tenants.  However, as of 2013 the former Lazarus-Macy's building remains both standing and vacant.

Glimcher defaulted on the mall's mortgage loan in 2012 and turned the property over via a deed in lieu of foreclosure to the lender, a CMBS trust that was serviced by LNR Property, in August 2014.

In March 2015, the mall was reportedly sold for $9.25 million. Earlier that year in January, J. C. Penney announced the closure of its existing store. It closed in May 2015.   

On January 4, 2017, Macy's announced that its Eastland Mall store would close.  The store closed in March 2017, leaving Sears as Eastland's only remaining anchor.

On June 6, 2017, Sears announced that its Eastland Mall store would close by early September, leaving the mall entirely without anchor stores.

Conditions at the mall declined drastically in its final years of operation, resulting in several health and safety code violations. In 2019, City Code Enforcement had begun issuing violations to Eastland Mall Holdings LLC for poor maintenance of the parking lot, structural issues, and zoning noncompliance. As these issues persisted and the mall continued to deteriorate, city officials had filed a case against Eastland Mall Holdings LLC in April 2021. In the court case held in June 2022, Eastland Mall LLC property manager Nihal Weerasinghe had admitted to various maintenance issues, including up to 1,200 potholes in the parking lot. On Monday, June 13 2022, Judge Stephanie Mingo had officially declared Eastland Mall a public nuisance. She ordered the mall's owners to make repairs to bring Eastland Mall to compliance. The case will go back to court on September 22, 2022. If the progress made on the mall is still deemed to be unsatisfactory by then, the City of Columbus will make its own repairs at the owner's expense, and possibly even demolish the property.

References

External links

Official website

Shopping malls in Columbus, Ohio
Defunct shopping malls in the United States
Buildings and structures in Columbus, Ohio
Washington Prime Group
Shopping malls in Ohio
Shopping malls established in 1968
Shopping malls disestablished in 2022